Gašper Okorn (born 9 April 1973) is a Slovenian professional basketball coach for Krka of the Slovenian League.

Coaching career 
On 23 January 2022, Croatian team Cibona hired Okorn as their new head coach for the rest of the 2021–22 season. He left Cibona in June 2022. On 24 June, Krka hired Okorn as their new head coach.

External links 
 Eurobasket Profile

References 

1973 births
Living people
AZS Koszalin coaches
Czarni Słupsk coaches
BK Ventspils coaches
KK Cibona coaches
KK Krka coaches
KK Olimpija coaches
Slovenian basketball coaches
Slovenian expatriate sportspeople in Hungary
Sportspeople from Ljubljana
KK Helios Domžale coaches